Polyestriol phosphate (PE3P, SEP), sold under the brand names Gynäsan, Klimadurin, and Triodurin, is an estrogen medication which was previously used in menopausal hormone therapy (i.e., to treat menopausal symptoms in postmenopausal women) and is no longer available.

Medical uses
PE3P has been used at a dosage of 40 to 80 mg by intramuscular injection once every 4 to 8 weeks in menopausal hormone therapy.

Available forms
PE3P has been available in the form of ampoules containing 50 to 80 mg in 1 or 2 mL aqueous solution.

Pharmacology
PE3P is similar to polyestradiol phosphate (PEP), and is, likewise, an estrogen ester – specifically, an ester and prodrug of estriol – in the form of a polymer with phosphate linkers. When adjusted for differences in molecular weight, PE3P contains the equivalent of about 80% of the amount of estriol. As such, 40 mg PE3P corresponds to about 32 mg estriol. Doses of PE3P of 10 mg or more have an extended duration of action. A single intramuscular injection of 80 mg PE3P has a duration of about 1 month and of 80 mg about 2 months.

The effects of PE3P on the vagina, uterus, pregnancy, prostate gland, coagulation, and fibrinolysis, as well as on mammary and endometrial cancer risk, have been studied. The endometrial proliferation dose of PE3P over 14 days in women is 40 to 60 mg by intramuscular injection.

Chemistry

PE3P is a water-soluble polymer of estriol with phosphoric acid.

History
PE3P was developed by the Swedish pharmaceutical company Leo Läkemedel AB in the 1960s. It was introduced for medical use by 1968.

Society and culture

Brand names
PE3P was marketed under brand names including Gynäsan, Klimadurin, and Triodurin.

Availability
PE3P was marketed in Germany and Spain.

See also
 Estriol phosphate
 Polytestosterone phloretin phosphate
 Polydiethylstilbestrol phosphate

References

Abandoned drugs
Copolymers
Estranes
Estriol esters
Phosphate esters
Phosphatase inhibitors
Prodrugs
Synthetic estrogens